Jakob Parelius Holmgren (1884—1962) was a Norwegian architect and a professor of architecture at the Norwegian Institute of Technology from 1935 to 1955. He designed, among other things, the redevelopment of the interior of Trondhjems Sparebank from 1921 to 1924, which later won the Houen Foundation's prize in 1927.

Holmgren was educated at Norwegian Institute of Technology in 1903. He was hired soon after by Lars Solberg in Trondheim as an assistant architect. From 1904-1907, he worked on many buildings in Ålesund to help rebuild after the great city fire there. He started his own architecture practice in Trondheim starting in 1907. He designed a number of tenements in Trondheim that were built in the style of Neoclassical architecture. He designed the Brattvær Church in Smøla and was part of the historic restoration of the Stiklestad Church from 1928-1930.

References

1884 births
1962 deaths
Architects from Trondheim
Academic staff of the Norwegian Institute of Technology